Rhynchopyga steniptera is a species of moth in the subfamily Arctiinae. It is found in Guyana.

References

Moths described in 1909
Euchromiina